Tsito Razafindrasata (born 2 October 1996) is a Malagasy football midfielder who currently plays for JET Kintana.

References

1996 births
Living people
Malagasy footballers
Madagascar international footballers
AS JET Mada players
JET Kintana players
Association football midfielders